Uri Rosenwaks  (Born 1965) is an Israeli director and producer.

Biography
Uri Rosenwaks was born in Jerusalem, grew up in Beersheba, and currently resides in Ramat Gan. He is married to Tami, and the couple has 3 children.
He is a graduate  of the School of Film and Television and has a Master's degree in Near Eastern Studies both from Tel Aviv University.
Rosenwaks embarked on his creative career in 1991 and since then he has directed, written and produced a large number of projects  for cinema and television, including documentary, fictional and current affairs. He served as the chairperson of The Israeli Documentary Filmmakers Forum between 2010 and 2013.

Documentary
Rosenwaks  is Director and Producer of a variety of documentary films and Series. His recent works include; "The Nobelists" 2015,
"Leibowitz: Faith, Country and Man" (in  collaboration with Rinat Klein) Honorable Mention at the Jerusalem Film Festival 2012,
and the award winning series "Lod Between Hope and Despair" (in collaboration with Eyal Blachson), winner of Best Series, The Israeli Documentary Awards 2013
and The Israeli Television Awards 2013.

Rosenwaks  was involved in a cinematic project in the Bedouin city of Rahat located in the Negev Desert in the southern part of Israel. Rosenwaks founded a film class for Bedouin women in Rahat. What began as an  afternoon course for teaching the use of a video–camera evolved into a full scale documentary workshop that has already produced two films: "The Film-Class" which premiered in the Jerusalem Film Festival in 2006 and won the Israeli Documentary TV Film of the Year Award for 2007
was the first project, followed by "Back and Forth" which Rosenwaks produced and is made up of four short stories, all directed by Bedouin directors on their professional debut.
He directed the film "Town on a Wire" (2015) with Eyal Blachson. The film's debut took place at the  Copenhagen International Documentary Festival in November 2015,
and competed at Docaviv Film Festival 2016.
In 2017 he created “The Great Eagle” a documentary series on the life and thought of Maimonides, it premiered in 2017 Jerusalem Film Festival.

In 2018 he directed and produced "The Right to Riot", a three part series about protests in Israel . "The Right to Riot" supported by Channel 8 and Rabinowitz foundation, won the Best series, The Israeli Documentary Awards 2018.
In 2019 his series ‘Kingdoms’  was aired on Israeli Public Broadcasting Corporation and Supported by Gesher & Maimonides fund, premiered in the Jewish film festival in Jerusalem.

Fiction
His graduation film "Saturday of the Groom" (fictional 1991) won the Israeli Film Institute Award for film of the year 1992 and The Israeli Directors Guild Award for Best Director.
He directed "Angel Eyes" (1996) a Television drama, part of the series "Short Stories about Love" produced by Hagai Levi (In Treatment);
and "Detective in Jerusalem", a TV mini-series produced by Assaf Amir (Broken Wings).

Television
He wrote and directed over 60 documentary reports. He directed and co-developed "The Food Trail", a series about food, families and culture in Israel and around the world, (produced by Assaf Amir) and nominated for the Israeli  Ophir Awards.

References

External links
 
About "The Nobelists":
(April 29, 2015). Interview with Rosenwaks. i24news.
 Steinberg, Jessica (April 22, 2015). "Lives of struggle, rejection, vindication: The essence of Israel’s ‘Nobelists’" The Times of Israel.

About "Town on the Wire":
 Gordon, Neve (Nov 5, 2015). "The undercurrents of violence in Israel and Palestine". Al Jazeera.
 (Nov 5, 2015). Interview with Rosenwaks. i24News.

About "The Film Class":
 Chanoff, David (Apr 14, 2015). "Director focuses on the legacy of Muslim slavery". The Forward.
"The Film Class", The New Fund for Cinema and Television
Burstein, Nathan (April 9, 2006). "A rare look at the tensions between the Negev's black and 'white' Beduin". The Jerusalem Post.
(2008). " Interview with director Uri Rosenwaks". Link Media.
About "Back and Forth":
"Screen/Society - Israeli Filmmaker Uri Rosenwaks 'Back and Forth' (Southern Premiere!)". Duke University.
'Back and Forth'. The international women's film festival Israel
Horn, Jordana (November 16, 2010). "Purposes to all in tents". The Forward.
About "Dor Shalem Darash Shalom":
 Gaon, Boaz. Gurfinkel, Jonathan (March 25, 2011). "Charge of the left brigade". Haaretz.
About "Leibowitz: Faith, Country & Man":
 Shudnow, Sanford H. (2013). Leibowitz: Faith, Country & Man. Australian Journal of Jewish Studies, Vol. 27.

About "Kingdoms"
 Shany Littman.  This ultra-Orthodox Israeli Woman, Who Stars in a Documentary on Her Sect, Wants Women to Learn the Torah. Haaretz.  December 17, 2019

1965 births
Living people
Israeli film directors
Israeli documentary filmmakers